Joseph Henry Wohleb (1887–1958) was an American architect from Washington.

Life and career
He was born in Waterbury, Connecticut, and grew up in California. He is known for the design of classic motion picture theaters in the 1920s. He was also the designer of Cloverfields in Olympia, a farmhouse listed on the National Register of Historic Places. Also, he served as the architect for the Washington State Capitol Museum and other buildings on the Washington State Capitol Campus.

In 1946, Joseph Wohleb's son, Robert, joined him in the architecture business and the two worked in their firm, Wohleb and Wohleb. Together, they designed many notable buildings in Thurston County.

Legacy
A number of Joseph's works and at least one of the partnership's works are listed on the U.S. National Register of Historic Places.

Architectural works
 Jeffers Studio, Olympia, Washington (1913, NRHP 1987)
 "Cloverfields" for Hazard Stevens, Olympia, Washington (1914, NRHP 1978)
 House for O. C. Hanson, Olympia, Washington (1914)
 House for John T. Otis, Olympia, Washington (1914)
 Olympia National Bank Building, Olympia, Washington (1914–15, NRHP 1987)
 Olympia Public Library, Olympia, Washington (1914, NRHP 1982)
 House for Charles H. Springer, Olympia, Washington (1917)
 Elks Building, Olympia, Washington (1919, NRHP 1988)
 Elks Lodge, Centralia, Washington (1919)
 Bremerton Elks Temple, Bremerton, Washington (1920, NRHP 1995)
 House for Emmett N. Parker, Olympia, Washington (1920)
 American Legion Hall, Olympia, Washington (1921, NRHP 1987)
 Centralia City Hall, Centralia, Washington (1921–23)
 House for M. L. McCully, Olympia, Washington (1921)
 Capital National Bank Building, Olympia, Washington (1922)
 House for Clarence J. Lord, Olympia, Washington (1923, NRHP 1981)
 Lincoln School (former), Olympia, Washington (1923)
 House for Henry McCleary, Olympia, Washington (1923, NRHP 1978)
 Capitol Theater, Olympia, Washington (1924)
 House for Joseph Wohleb, Olympia, Washington (1926)
 Mason County Courthouse, Shelton, Washington (1929–30, NRHP 2013)
 Thurston County Courthouse, Olympia, Washington (1929–30, NRHP 1981)
 Olympia Press Building, Olympia, Washington (1930)
 John A. Cherberg Building of the Washington State Capitol, Olympia, Washington (1937)
 House for F. W. Schmidt, Olympia, Washington (1938, NRHP 1995)
 Washington State Capitol Conservatory, Olympia, Washington (1938–39)
 House for Walter Draham, Olympia, Washington (1940)
 Rockway-Leland Building, Olympia, Washington (1941)
 Georgia-Pacific Plywood Company Office, Olympia, Washington (1952, NRHP 2007)
 Bay View Brewery, Seattle, Washington (no date, NRHP 2013)
 Rainier Brewery addition, Seattle, Washington (no date)

Gallery of architectural works

Notes

References

External links
About Jacob Smith House — City of Lacey Website

20th-century American architects
1958 deaths
1887 births
People from Lacey, Washington
Architects from Waterbury, Connecticut
Architects from Washington (state)